Vrbina is a settlement on the right bank of the Sava River in the Municipality of Krško in eastern Slovenia. The Krško Nuclear Power Plant is built on the southern side of the settlement. The area is part of the traditional region of Lower Carniola. It is now included with the rest of the municipality in the Lower Sava Statistical Region.

References

External links

Vrbina on Geopedia

Populated places in the Municipality of Krško